James Kihara (born 1 December 1958) is a Kenyan judoka. He competed in the men's half-middleweight event at the 1988 Summer Olympics.

References

External links
 

1958 births
Living people
Kenyan male judoka
Olympic judoka of Kenya
Judoka at the 1988 Summer Olympics
Place of birth missing (living people)